Anant Kakba Priolkar was an Indian polemicist, author and political activist. Born in 1895, he started writing while he was in school and his writing stopped only with his death. He was also elected as the President of the Akhil Bharatiya Marathi Sahitya Sammelan held in 1951 at Karwar. His book The Goa Inquisition remains his bestselling work on account of it being pro-Hindu. He also considered Konkani as a dialect of Marathi language. He died in Maharashtra in 1973.

Bibliography
 The Printing Press in India: Its Beginnings and Early Development being a quatercentenary commemoration study of the advent of printing in India in 1556. Bombay: Marathi Samshodhana Mandala, 1958.
 The Goa Inquisition (A Quatercentenary Commemoration Study of the Inquisition in India, printed by V. G. Moghe at Mumbai University Press, Mumbai) (1961)
Granthik Marathi Bhashya Ani Kokani Boli (ग्रान्थिक मराठी भाषा आणि कोकणी बोली).
"French Author of a Marathi Purana, Fr. Etienne de la Croix." Journal of the University of Bombay n.s. 29/2 (1959) 122–149.
Goa Re-discovered. Bhakta Books International, 1967.
 Priya Ani Apriya (प्रिय आणि अप्रिय)

References

Tadkodkar, S.M. [Ph.D. on A.K. Priolkar submitted to the Goa University.]
Ludo Rocher, The Puranas. A History of Indian Literature, vol. 2, fasc. 3. (Wiesbaden: Harassowitz, 1986) 75.
Preface by J.S. Sukhtankar and Subhash Bhende to A.K. Priolkar's "Hindustanche Don Darwaje", published by 'The Goa Hindu Association' (Mumbai) in 1974.

20th-century Indian historians
Marathi people